The Dallastown Area School District is a large, suburban, public school district serving the Boroughs of Dallastown, Jacobus, Loganville, and Yoe and Springfield Township and York Township in York County, Pennsylvania. There were approximately 35,000 residents in 2009. The US Census reported that the population had increased to 41,142 people in 2010.

Dallastown Area School District operates five elementary schools (K-3), one intermediate school (4-6), one middle school (7-8), and one high school (9-12).

Extracurriculars

Sports
Dallastown Area High School and Middle School teams are part of the PIAA triple or quad A, District 3, and York/Adams Interscholastic Athletic Association (YAIAA) Division I. In 2007, all of Dallastown Area High School's fall sports teams went on to compete in District III post-season play.

The District funds:

Boys
Baseball - AAAA
Basketball- AAAA
Cross Country - AAA
Football - AAAA
Golf - AAA
Indoor Track and Field - AAAA
Lacrosse - AAAA
Soccer - AAA
Swimming and Diving - AAA
Tennis - AAA
Track and Field - AAA
Volleyball - AAA
Wrestling - AAA

Girls
Basketball - AAAA
Cross Country - AAA
Indoor Track and Field - AAAA
Field Hockey - AAA
Lacrosse - AAAA
Soccer (Fall) - AAA
Softball - AAAA
Swimming and Diving - AAAA
Girls' Tennis - AAA
Track and Field - AAA
Volleyball - AAA

Middle School Sports

Boys
Basketball
Cross Country
Football
Soccer
Track and Field
Wrestling	

Girls
Basketball
Cross Country
Field Hockey
Softball 
Track and Field
Volleyball

According to PIAA Directory July 2012

References

External links
Dallastown Area School District website

School districts in York County, Pennsylvania